Lithagonum is a genus of ground beetles in the family Carabidae. This genus has a single species, Lithagonum annulicorne. It is found in Indonesia and Papua New Guinea.

References

Platyninae